Sonny Thompson (probably August 23, 1916 – August 11, 1989), born Alfonso Thompson or Hezzie Tompson, was an American R&B bandleader and pianist, popular in the 1940s and 1950s.

Biography
There is some uncertainty over Thompson's origins, as well as his birth name.  Researchers Bob Eagle and Eric LeBlanc indicate that he was born in 1916 in Wilkinson County, Mississippi, but other sources state that he was born in 1923, either in Mississippi  or in Chicago.

He began recording in 1946, and in 1948 achieved two #1 R&B chart hits on the Miracle label – "Long Gone (Parts I and II)" and "Late Freight", both featuring saxophonist Eddie Chamblee. The follow-ups "Blue Dreams" and "Still Gone" also reached the R&B chart.  By 1952 he had moved on to King Records, where he worked in A&R  and as a session musician and arranger.   At King, he had further R&B Top 10 successes with the singer Lula Reed, the biggest hit being "I'll Drown in My Tears".  Thompson married Reed sometime in the early 1950s. He continued to work as a session musician, and to perform with Reed into the early 1960s. He also had success as a songwriter, often co-writing with blues guitarist, Freddie King.

Thompson died in 1989 in Chicago.

Discography

Original 10" shellac (78rpm) and 7" vinyl (45rpm) releases
MIRACLE releases:
 108  Sonny's Blues* // Screamin' Boogie ---by Dick Davis and Orchestra featuring Sonny Thompson (*vocal by Sonny)
 109  Memphis Train // Benson Jump ---by Dick Davis and Orchestra featuring Sonny Thompson
 123  If I Didn't Have You** // Palmer's Boogie ---by Sonny Thompson Orchestra (**vocal by Gladys Palmer; "Palmer's Boogie" is a piano duet between Sonny and Gladys)
 124  Tears Follow My Dreams*** // Moon Is On My Side ---by Sonny Thompson with the Sharps and Flats [Arvin Garrett-guitar/Leroy Morrison-bass/Thurman "Red" Cooper-drums] (***vocal by Browley Guy)
 126  Long Gone (Pt. 1) // Long Gone (Pt. 2)+ ---by Sonny Thompson with the Sharps and Flats (+featuring Eddie Chamblee-tenor sax)
 127  In The Rain** // Just Boogie (AKA "Deadline Boogie") ---by Sonny Thompson with the Sharps and Flats (**vocal by Gladys Palmer)
 128  Late Freight (AKA "Creepin'")+ // Sonny's Return (AKA "House Full Of Blues" or simply "Blues") ---by Sonny Thompson Quintet (+featuring Eddie Chamblee-tenor sax)
 131  Blue Dreams+ // Blues On Rhumba ---by Sonny Thompson and Orchestra (+featuring Eddie Chamblee-tenor sax)
 139  Still Gone (Pt. 3) // Still Gone (Pt. 4) ---by Sonny "Long Gone" Thompson and Orchestra
 146  Dreaming Again // Backyard Affair ---by Sonny Thompson and Orchestra
 148  Sonny Claus Blues* // Not On A Xmas Tree ---by Sonny Thompson and Orchestra (*vocal by Sonny)

OLD SWING MASTER (or simply 'MASTER') release:
 1011  The Fish (Pt. 1) // The Fish (Pt. 2) ---by Sonny Thompson and His Orchestra

KING releases:
 4345  Sugar Cane // I'm Coming Back Home To Stay^ (^vocal by band ensemble)
 4364  After Sundown // Frog Legs
 4384  Nightfall // Palmetto 
 4399  Blues For The Night Owls // Harlem Rug Cutter
 4431  Smoke Stack Blues // Uncle Sam Blues* (*vocal by Jesse Edwards)
 4438  Long Gone (Pt. 1) // Long Gone (Pt. 2) ---reissue of Miracle 126
 4446  Gone Again Blues // Jumping With The Rhumba* (*vocal by Jesse Edwards)
 4470  Blue Piano** // Sunshine Blues (**vocal by Royal Trent)
 4488  Mellow Blues (Pt. 1) // Mellow Blues (Pt. 2) (featuring Robert Hadley-tenor sax on both sides)
 4527  I'll Drown In My Tears*** // Clang, Clang, Clang (***vocal by Lula Reed)
 4541  Let's Call It A Day*** // Blues Mambo (***vocal by Lula Reed)
 4554  Real, Real Fine (Pt. 1) // Real, Real Fine (Pt. 2)
 4595  Chloe // Last Night*** (***vocal by Lula Reed)
 4613  Clean Sweep // Insulated Sugar+ (+vocal by Rufus Junior)
 4639  Low Flame // Waiting To Be Loved By You*** (***vocal by Lula Reed)
 4657  Let's Move // My Heart Needs Someone+ (+vocal by Rufus Junior)
 4678  Pastry // I Hope You Love Me Too+ (+vocal by Rufus Junior)
 4698  Things Ain't What They Used To Be // So-o-o Good
 4712  Down In The Dumps // I Ain't No Watch Dog++ (++vocal by Paul Tate)
 4718  Single Shot // I'm Beggin' And Pleadin'++ (++vocal by Paul Tate)
 4729  Cotton Ball (Pt. 1) // Cotton Ball (Pt. 2) (featuring David Bubba Brooks-tenor sax on both sides)
 4746  Cat On The Keys (Pt. 1) // Cat On The Keys (Pt. 2) 
 4791  Behind The Sun (Pt. 1) // Behind The Sun (Pt. 2)
 4809  First Base // Lonely Moon 
 4899  I'll Drown In My Tears // Let's Call It A Day ---reissues of King 4527A and 4541A
 4992  Low Down // Lost In This Great Big City++ (++vocal by Paul Tate)
 5055  Gum Shoe+++ // Stop, Come See Me++ (++vocal by Paul Tate; +++featuring King Curtis-tenor sax)
 5396  The Duck Walk // Swinging Shepherd Blues

CHART releases:
 611  It's Love, It's Love // Mexico Bound (vocal by The Champions "vocal group" on both sides)
 612  Slow Rock (Pt. 1) // Slow Rock (Pt. 2) (featuring David Bubba Brooks-tenor sax on both sides)
 618  Bus Ride // Foot Stompin' (featuring David Bubba Brooks-tenor sax on both sides)
 620  The Same Old Story // Pay Me Some Attention (vocal by The Champions "vocal group" on both sides)
 630  Bus Ride // Foot Stompin' (featuring David Bubba Brooks-tenor sax on both sides) ---reissue of Chart 618
 631  Come On // Big Bad Beulah (vocal by The Champions "vocal group" on both sides)
 633  Juke Joint (Pt. 1) // Juke Joint (Pt. 2)
 637  Drive In // Drive Out
 642  Candy (Pt. 1) // Candy (Pt. 2)
 645  Hi-Ho // Day Break Blues
 648  Caribbean Cruise // Night Watch

Original 7" vinyl EP releases
 Sonny Thompson, Vol. 1 (King KEP-209, 1952) -song titles: Mellow Blues (Pt. 2); Sugar Cane // Long Gone (Pt. 2); Real, Real Fine (Pt. 2)
 Sonny Thompson, Vol. 2 (King KEP-264, 1953) -song titles: I'll Drown In My Tears (vocal by Lula Reed); Let's Call It A Day (vocal by Lula Reed) // Low Flame; Chloe 
 Sonny Thompson, Vol. 3 (King KEP-273, 1954) -song titles: Blues For The Night Owls; Blues Mambo // Clean Sweep; Down In The Dumps
 Sonny Thompson, Vol. 4 (King KEP-274, 1954) -song titles: Let's Move; Single Shot // Sunshine Blues; Frog Legs
 Sonny Thompson, Vol. 5 (King KEP-275, 1954) -song titles: Things Ain't What They Used To Be; So-o-o Good // Clang, Clang, Clang; Pastry

Original 12" vinyl LP releases
 Moody Blues (Play Only After Midnight) (King LP-568, 1958) -song titles: Long Gone (Pt. 1); Long Gone (Pt. 2); After Sundown; Low Down; Blues For The Night Owls; Cotton Ball (Pt. ?); Sunshine Blues; Behind The Sun (Pt. ?) // Mellow Blues (Pt. ?); So-o-o Good; Pastry; Low Flame; Nightfall; Lonely Moon; Gone Again Blues; Down In The Dumps
 Mellow Blues For The Late Hours (16 Instrumentals) (King LP-655, 1959) -song titles: Mellow Blues (Pt. 1); Palmetto; Clang, Clang, Clang; Sugar Cane; Cat On The Keys (Pt. 1); Cat On The Keys (Pt. 2); Cotton Ball (Pt. 1); Single Shot // Smoke Stack Blues; Real, Real Fine (Pt. ?); Let's Move; Behind The Sun (Pt. ?); Blues Mambo; First Base; Gum Shoe; Frog Legs

As sideman
With Howlin' Wolf
Message to the Young (Chess, 1971)

References

20th-century births
1989 deaths
People from Centreville, Mississippi
Songwriters from Mississippi
American bandleaders
Rhythm and blues pianists
Musicians from Mississippi
20th-century American pianists
American male pianists
20th-century American male musicians
American male songwriters